Iván Zarandona Esono (born 30 August 1980) is an Equatorial Guinean former footballer and a sports agent. Mainly a defensive midfielder, he also operated as a central defender.

He spent the better part of his career in Spain, representing Valladolid at the professional level.

Zarandona was a member of the Equatorial Guinea national team.

Club career
Born in Valladolid, Castile and León, Spain, Zarandona played the vast majority of his career in the lower leagues of that country, having a second division stint with Real Valladolid in the 2004–05 season where he played in less than half of the games.

Rarely settling with a club, he also represented CF Extremadura, CD Ferriolense, RCD Mallorca B, Real Betis B, Caravaca CF, Rayo Vallecano, Zamora CF, Real Murcia Imperial, UD Los Palacios, UD Pájara Playas de Jandía, CD Leganés, Real Jaén, CD Lugo, SD Noja and Burgos CF. In the third level, he appeared in more than 300 official matches for several teams.

International career
Zarandona played for the Spain under-18 team but, in June 2003, FIFA allowed the player to change his nationality. This rule originally applied only for under-21 players not yet capped for the senior sides, but FIFA also allowed overage ones to apply, until December 2004.

Zarandona started representing his "new nation", Equatorial Guinea, in October 2003, in the 2006 FIFA World Cup qualification first round tie loss against Togo.

International goals
 (Equatorial Guinea score listed first, score column indicates score after each Zarandona goal)

Personal life
Zarandona's father is Basque, and his mother was from Equatorial Guinea. His older brother, Benjamín, successfully represented Valladolid, Real Betis and the Spain under-21 team, before switching to the Equatorial Guinea at senior level.

Club statistics

References

External links

HKFA profile

1980 births
Living people
Spanish sportspeople of Equatoguinean descent
Spanish people of Basque descent
Equatoguinean sportspeople of Spanish descent
Equatoguinean people of Basque descent
Footballers from Valladolid
Spanish footballers
Equatoguinean footballers
Citizens of Equatorial Guinea through descent
Association football midfielders
Segunda División players
Segunda División B players
Tercera División players
RCD Mallorca B players
RCD Mallorca players
Betis Deportivo Balompié footballers
Caravaca CF players
Real Valladolid players
Rayo Vallecano players
Zamora CF footballers
Real Murcia Imperial players
CD Leganés players
Real Jaén footballers
CD Lugo players
Burgos CF footballers
CF Palencia footballers
CD Tropezón players
Atlético Astorga FC players
Hong Kong First Division League players
Hong Kong Rangers FC players
Spain youth international footballers
Equatorial Guinea international footballers
2015 Africa Cup of Nations players
Spanish expatriate footballers
Equatoguinean expatriate footballers
Expatriate footballers in Hong Kong
Spanish expatriate sportspeople in Hong Kong
Equatoguinean expatriate sportspeople in Hong Kong
Association football agents